The Ball Theatre, also known as the Millstone Theatre, is a historic movie theater located in Millsboro, Delaware. It was listed on the National Register of Historic Places in 2018.

References

National Register of Historic Places in Delaware
Theatres
Millsboro, Delaware